Vladimir Petercă  (24 April 1944 – 23 September 2022) was a Romanian Roman Catholic theologian who served as rector of the  from 1995 to 2006.

Biography
Vladimir Petercă was born on 24 April 1944, in Mircești village, Iași County. Petercă was part of the same class as the future Roman Catholic Archbishop of Bucharest, Ioan Robu.

With the support of Bishop Pleșca, he followed specialization studies at the Pontifical Biblical Institute in Rome (1973–1977), becoming degreed in Bible and then a Ph.D. student at the Pontifical Gregorian University in Rome (1977–1981). On 1 November 1980 he defended a doctoral thesis in theology,  titled "Image of Solomon in Hebrew and Greek Bible – a contribution to the Midrash's study". During the same period, Petercă followed two semesters of courses at the Hebrew University of Jerusalem (in the first theological student exchange between Vatican City and Israel) and earned a bachelor of science degree from the Augustinianum Patristic Institute in Rome.

Back in Romania, during 1981–1995 he worked as lecturer, senior lecturer, and then professor at the Roman Catholic Institute of Iași, teaching courses in Biblical theology, Biblical exegesis, and Biblical languages. From 1990, he also taught  introductory courses on the Bible in the Department of History at Alexandru Ioan Cuza University. He was a visiting professor at the University of Münster (1985–1986) and the University of Munich (1988–1989).

From 1 December 1995, Petercă served as rector of the Saint Theresa Roman Catholic Institute of Bucharest, being professor of Biblical sciences. He was a regular presence on radio and television, where he lectured on Biblical and theological themes. He retired in 2006.

Collaboration with the Securitate
He would report directly to the Iași Securitate chief, colonel Constantin Ciurlău; starting in 1986, he would also cooperate with the Directorate for Foreign Intelligence during his trips overseas. He informed on his colleagues and students at the Roman Catholic Institute in Iași, as well as the Western clergy with whom he came into contact. Shortly after the news broke, the priest  (one of the people Petercă informed on to the Securitate) said he was "disappointed, as an adult requires a lot more, especially from a priest as we teach students to be honest, be sincere, genuine, loyal, so we have to be" and that he would "not make comments about Vladimir Petercă". Especially affected by Petercă's  actions were the priest Petru Mareș, and his brother, Iosif. 

In 2011 the Bucharest Court of Appeal confirmed the NCSSA's finding regarding Petercă. On appeal, the decision was annulled, because the court had not been properly notified.

Books published

See also
Catholic Church in Romania

References

1944 births
2022 deaths
People from Iași County
Romanian Roman Catholic priests
Romanian theologians
Pontifical Gregorian University alumni
Hebrew University of Jerusalem alumni
Securitate informants
Recipients of the Order of Cultural Merit (Romania)